The roughback sea catfish, Plicofollis tonggol, is a species of sea catfish  known as manyung in Indonesia and arahan in the Philippines, where it is regarded important in the fishing industry. As food, roughback sea catfish are sun-dried and salted before actual trade and consumption.

Characteristics
The roughback sea catfish grows up to 40 cm long.  They live in the salty waters of tropical regions of the world. They feed on invertebrates. They have pointed dorsal fins, which can cause injury if held by unprotected human hands.

Distribution
They are found at the coastal waters of Indonesia, Malaysia, the Philippines, and Pakistan.

References

Ariidae
Fish of the Philippines
Fish of Southeast Asia
Philippine cuisine
Fish described in 1846